The Camp Lincoln Commissary Building is a historic building on the grounds of Camp Lincoln, a National Guard camp in Springfield, Illinois. Built in 1903, the commissary is the oldest building remaining at Camp Lincoln. The camp, which opened in 1886, had previously used tents or temporary buildings for most of its activities, and the commissary soon became the camp's center of activity; it has served as a headquarters, barracks, hospital, and physical examination center at various points. The Culver Stone Company, which constructed several of Springfield's public buildings, built the commissary. The rusticated limestone building is designed to resemble a castle, as it features turrets and battlements along its roof. The building now houses a military museum.

The building was added to the National Register of Historic Places on November 13, 1984.

References

National Register of Historic Places in Springfield, Illinois
Military facilities on the National Register of Historic Places in Illinois
Buildings and structures completed in 1903
Buildings and structures in Sangamon County, Illinois
Illinois National Guard